Kanagal is a village in Nalgonda district of Telangana, India.

References

Mandal headquarters in Nalgonda district